La Grève-sur-Mignon is a commune in the Charente-Maritime department in southwestern France.

Before 1928, it was known as Saint-Martin-de-Villeneuve.

Population

Personalities
La Grève-sur-Mignon was the birthplace of:
 Lova Moor, dancer and singer

See also
Communes of the Charente-Maritime department

References

External links

 Grève-sur-Mignon La Grève-sur-Mignon on the Quid site

Communes of Charente-Maritime
Arrondissement of La Rochelle
Charente-Maritime communes articles needing translation from French Wikipedia